Shayne Culpepper (née Wille; born December 3, 1973 in Atlanta U.S.) is a middle distance runner. She is a two-time Olympian in track and field; in 2004 in the 5,000m and in 2000 in the 1,500m.

She is married to long-distance track and road running athlete Alan Culpepper. In her early years Culpepper competed for many years in  gymnastics.

After transferring from The University of Vermont after a year, she graduated from University of Colorado at Boulder with a degree in political science.

Although qualifying for the 2000 Summer Olympics in Sydney, Australia, due to Regina Jacobs falling ill, Shayne could not manage to progress through the qualifying rounds after running 4:12.52 in the 1,500m.  After winning the 2004 5,000 m. Olympic trials she competed again at the 2004 Summer Olympics and placed 13th in the 5k at the first round, not allowing her to go on to the finals.

In 2003, she returned to athletics after having her first child, Cruz Samuel, and on February 16 won the national 4 kilometre cross-country championships.  Alan won the men's championship the same day.

In March 2004 Shayne qualified for the 3,000 m. at the World Indoor Championships, she earned the bronze medal, finishing the race in less than a second behind the winner Meseret Defar and silver medalist Berhane Adere.

Major achievements
2003
USA Cross Country Championships
4 km. champion
USA Indoor Championships
3,000 m. silver medal
1,500 m. bronze medal
2004
World Indoor Championships - Budapest, Hungary.
3,000 m. bronze medal
USA Indoor Championships
3,000 m. gold medal
United States Olympic Trials
5,000 m. champion
2007
USA Indoor Championships
mile m. gold medal

Video Links
Flotrack Videos of Shayne Culpepper

References

External links
Shayne Culpepper's U.S. Olympic Team bio

1973 births
Living people
American female middle-distance runners
American female long-distance runners
Colorado Buffaloes women's track and field athletes
Athletes (track and field) at the 2000 Summer Olympics
Athletes (track and field) at the 2004 Summer Olympics
Olympic track and field athletes of the United States